Strugnell as a surname may refer to:

 John Strugnell (1930–2007), British scholar who worked on the Dead Sea Scrolls
 Dan Strugnell (born 1992), British footballer 
 William Strugnell (1892–1977), British World War I flying ace
 the fictional Jake/Jason Strugnell, a poet from Tulse Hill, a persona employed by the poet Wendy Cope in her collection Making Cocoa for Kingsley Amis (1986), and author of Strugnell's Haiku.